Jim Marriott (born December 10, 1934 in Ogden, Utah) was a Republican Idaho State Representative from 2006-2012.

Education
Marriott earned his bachelor's degree in business administration from Utah State University.

Elections

Idaho House of Representatives District 31 Seat B

2012 
Redistricted to 31B, Marriott lost the Republican primary to Julie VanOrden taking only 37.6% of the vote.

Idaho House of Representatives District 28 Seat B

2010 
Marriott was unopposed for the Republican primary and the general election.

2008 
Marriott was unopposed for the Republican primary and the general election.

2006 
At the end of the 2006 legislative session in April, Republican Representative Joseph S. Cannon resigned; Marriott won the three-way Republican primary with 46.2% of the vote defeating R. Scott Reese and Kirk G. Sheppard and was appointed to the vacancy in June by Governor Jim Risch. Marriott defeated Democratic nominee with 63.16% of the vote in the general election.

References

External links
Jim Marriott at the Idaho Legislature
 

1934 births
Latter Day Saints from Utah
Latter Day Saints from Idaho
Living people
Republican Party members of the Idaho House of Representatives
People from Blackfoot, Idaho
Politicians from Ogden, Utah
United States Army officers
Utah State University alumni